Bishop Moore College is an aided college in Mavelikkara, Alappuzha, Kerala, India, affiliated with the University of Kerala. The college is ranked 58 in NIRF 2022, 89 in NIRF 2021, 76 in NIRF 2020, in the rank band 101–150 in NIRF (National Institutional Ranking Framework) 2019, and ranked 92 in NIRF 2018. The college was accredited by NAAC with an "A" Grade in 2017 (Third Cycle of Accreditation). The college is managed by the Madhya Kerala Diocese of the Church of South India, and offers 11 undergraduate programs, five postgraduate programs, and two research programs. It is located at Kallumala, Mavelikara. The current principal of the college is Dr. Jacob Chandy.

History

In 1964, the Kerala Government announced the need to start more junior colleges in the state. In response, Bishop Rt. Rev. M.M. John of the CSI Madhya Kerala Diocese made the decision to establish the college, renaming it in honor of the late Edward Moore, the fourth Anglican Bishop of Travancore and Cochin of the Church Missionary Society. In 1964, the college began operations as a Junior College offering a two-year-long Pre-Degree course for the University of Kerala. The founding Principal was Rev. K C Mathew.

In 1968, the University of Kerala sanctioned the provision of undergraduate courses. The first postgraduate course started in 1982. After the de-linking of Pre-Degree courses from the university education system in 2000, the college now offers ten undergraduate and three postgraduate programs.

Post-graduate classes started in the Department of Physics in 1983. The center for Nonlinear studies started in 2000. The University of Kerala approved the Department of Physics as a research department in 2013.

Courses
Degree Courses
B.A English Language and Literature
B.A Malayalam
B.A Economics
B.Sc Mathematics
B.Sc Physics
B.Sc Chemistry
B.Sc Zoology
B.Sc Biotechnology
Bachelor of Commerce (B.Com.Finance and B.Com.Computer Application ) 
Post Graduate Courses
M.Sc Physics
M.Sc Analytical Chemistry
M.A English
M.A Economics 
M.Sc Botany
M.A Behavioural Economics and Data Science (New Generation Course)
Research Departments

1. Department of Physics

Theoretical Physics- Nonlinear dynamics, Quantum Computations,
Nanomaterials,
Spectroscopy,

Research Guides
Dr. Thomas Kuruvilla, Dr. D Sajan

2. Department of Chemistry

Spectroscopy

Notable alumni
 Saji Cheriyan, Former Minister of Fisheries, Culture and Kerala State Film Development Corporation
Justice CT.Ravikumar , Judge, Supreme Court of India
 M. S. Arun Kumar, MLA
 Pramod Narayanan, MLA
 M Murali, ex-MLA
 Dr. Valson Thampu, an academic and a social thinker of national repute. Former principal, St. Stephen's College, New Delhi.
 Adv. B Babu Prasad, ex-MLA
 B. Aburaj, Director, State Institute of Educational Technology, Kerala and Gen. Secretary, Indian Philosophical Society.

Notable conferences and seminars

Refresher course in theoretical physics
Bishop Moore College on 07 – 19 December 2009
Sponsored by the Indian Academy of Sciences, 
Coordinator Dr. Thomas Kuruvilla, Department of Physics.
Dr. Thomas Kuruvilla was the Principal of Bishop Moore College from 2012 to 2014.
During his tenure, the Department of Physics was upgraded as a Research Department.

Molecular Spectroscopy of Advanced Materials and Biomolecules 
IMSAB 2012  from 7 to 9 August 2012
International Conference in the Department of Physics
Organised by Dr. D Sajan

National seminar-Inclusive Growth and Indian  Economy - 20 Years of Liberation
A national seminar with the financial help of UGC was conducted in the Economics Department.

Kerala planning board member Sri C. P. John inaugurated the function. Eminent scholars and academicians from various parts of India have participated.

International Conference on Marxism
Organised by post-graduation Department of English in 2019

Principals and achievements
Rev. K.C. Mathew was the founding principal of Bishop Moore College. He served the college from 1964 to 1989. During this period, he played an important role in college's offering of postgraduate studies. Below is a list of principals that succeeded him after his retirement.

 Prof. M.K. Cherian (8 years)
 Prof. Mammen Varkey Varkey (5 years)
 Prof. Victor Sam (4 years)
 Prof. Koshy Ninan (4 years)
 Prof. Matthew Koshy (2 years)
 Prof. Kurien Thomas (1 year)
 Dr. Thomas Kuruvilla
 Dr. Leelamma George
 Dr. Sabu George

Dr. Thomas Kuruvilla was the principal of Bishop Moore College from 2012 to 2014. During his tenure, the college received four first ranks for degree examinations and one second rank for the PG examination of the University of Kerala, as well as conducting two international seminars in Physics.
 All departments conducted national seminars.
 The college won many prizes in sports, games, and university youth festivals.
 Bishop Moore hosted the University Youth festival.
 The college auditorium was renovated and made echo-proof.
 A grant was received for the basketball and volleyball courts, as well as one for a generator.
 The college was granted ten million rupees by UGC-FIST.
 Five new classrooms and prayer centers were built.
 The M.Sc. Course in Botany and B.Com. was equipped with a computer and applications began.
 Bishop Moore had the best results in the University Examinations of 2013 and 2014.
 The college girl's hostel was renovated.
 Golden Jubilee celebrations were inaugurated by the Honorable Governor of Kerala in a grand function.

The current principal is Dr. Jacob Chandy from the Department of Zoology. He is an alumnus of Bishop Moore College.

References

External links
Kerala University

Christian universities and colleges in India
Colleges affiliated to the University of Kerala
Universities and colleges in Alappuzha district